Aloe corallina is a species of plant in the genus Aloe. It is native  to Angola and Namibia.  Its natural habitats are subtropical or tropical dry shrubland and rocky areas. It is threatened by habitat loss.

References 

corallina
Flora of Angola
Flora of Namibia
Least concern plants
Least concern biota of Africa
Taxonomy articles created by Polbot